MEPEA, or 3-methoxy-4-ethoxyphenethylamine, is a lesser-known psychedelic drug. MEPEA was first synthesized by Alexander Shulgin. In his book PiHKAL (Phenethylamines i Have Known And Loved), the minimum dosage is listed as 300 mg, and the duration unknown. MEPEA produces a light lifting feeling and a +1 on the Shulgin Rating Scale.  Very little data exists about the pharmacological properties, metabolism, and toxicity of MEPEA.

See also 

 Phenethylamine
 Psychedelics, dissociatives and deliriants

References 

Psychedelic phenethylamines